Gryphus may refer to:
 Gryphus (brachiopod), a genus of brachiopods in the family Terebratulidae
 Gryphus, a genus of bivalves in the family Chamidae, synonym of Chama
 Gryphus, a genus of beetles in the family Terebratulidae, synonym of Grypus